Buitenhof is a Dutch political interview programme produced by AVROTROS, BNNVARA and VPRO Netherlands Public Broadcasting and is broadcast on NPO 1 on Sunday afternoons, immediately after the short midday edition of NOS Journaal. The first edition of Buitenhof aired on 3 September 1995, when it succeeded the interview programme Het Capitool. The programme takes its name from the Binnenhof, The Hague, which includes a place Buitenhof (lit. outer court).

Twan Huys, Rob Trip and Pieter Jan Hagens are among the programme's alternating presenters, and it is broadcast from the Veemvloer in Amsterdam. The editor in chief is Corinne Hegeman.

The programme 
Buitenhof is an influential programme, and is regularly visited by the nation's top politicians, policy makers, representatives of the trade unions and employers' federation, scientists, and opinion makers. There is a strong emphasis on international events, and international guests regularly appear on the programme.

Incidents 
Buitenhof itself made news in 2000, when visiting Vlaams Belang politician Filip Dewinter was smeared with chocolate, on camera, by anti-fascism activists.

The programme is also broadcast each Sunday on the international television station BVN.

See also
 , televised in Flanders, Belgium by the VRT.

External links

Dutch television news shows
1997 Dutch television series debuts
1990s Dutch television series
2000s Dutch television series
2010s Dutch television series
Television news program articles using incorrect naming style
NPO 1 original programming